The men's featherweight event was part of the boxing programme at the 1924 Summer Olympics. The weight class was the third-lightest contested, and allowed boxers of up to 126 pounds (57.2 kilograms). The competition was held from 15 to 20 July 1924. 24 boxers from 17 nations competed.

Results

References

Sources
 official report
 

Featherweight